Ivan Hamaliy (20 October 1956 – 18 December 2022) was a Ukrainian professional football player and coach who played as a midfielder.

Hamaliy died in Portugal on 18 December 2022, at the age of 66.

References

External links
 
 
 Kuzmiak, L. Ivan Hamaliy: "After defeat to "Chornomorets" in the Cup semifinals, I cried" (Іван ГАМАЛІЙ: «Після поразки «Чорноморцю» в півфіналі Кубка я плакав»). Ukrayinskyi futbol.

1956 births
2022 deaths
Sportspeople from Lviv Oblast
Soviet footballers
Ukrainian footballers
Association football midfielders
SC Lutsk players
SKA Lviv players
FC SKA-Karpaty Lviv players
FC Karpaty Lviv players
FC Halychyna Drohobych players
Miedź Legnica players
FC Krystal Chortkiv players
FC Lviv (1992) players
SC Skify Lviv players
FC Sambir players
Ukrainian men's futsal players
Ukrainian football managers
FC Krystal Chortkiv managers